Rama Chandra Hansdah is an Indian politician. He was elected to the 16th Lok Sabha in 2014 from Mayurbhanj constituency in Odisha.
He had left Nationalist Congress Party and joined Biju Janata Dal (BJD) in June 2012 along with other three NCP MLAs.
He is a former member of Legislative Assembly of Odisha.He was arrested by CBI on 4 November 2014 for his alleged involvement in chit fund scam.

See also
 Indian general election, 2014 (Odisha)

References

Living people
Lok Sabha members from Odisha
India MPs 2014–2019
Members of the Odisha Legislative Assembly
People from Mayurbhanj district
Indian prisoners and detainees
Biju Janata Dal politicians
Nationalist Congress Party politicians from Odisha
Year of birth missing (living people)